The Three Represents or the important thought of Three Represents is a guiding socio-political theory within China credited to then-general secretary of the Chinese Communist Party (CCP), Jiang Zemin, which was ratified at the 16th Party Congress in 2002. The "Three Represents" defines the role of the CCP. Jiang Zemin first introduced his theory on 25 February 2000 while on an inspection tour in Maoming, Guangdong province.

Background

Following the tenure of Deng Xiaoping, Jiang Zemin articulated a new theory to define the new relationship between the party and the people, which is named "Three Represents." The theory requires the CCP to:

 Represent the development trend of China's advanced productive forces.
 Represent the orientation of China's advanced culture.
 Represent the fundamental interests of the overwhelming majority of the Chinese people.
The "Three Represents" were written into the party constitution on March 14, 2004.

Justification of the “Three Represents” 
"The Three Represents" results from Jiang Zemin's efforts to grapple with the diverse class backgrounds of party members and their sometimes conflicting material interests. Jiang first delivered a speech about the "Three Represents" on 25 February 2000 during a symposium on party building in Guangzhou. It brought wide attention and many interpretations of the meaning of the speech.

Jiang said that by representing Chinese people in three levels, the party used the interests and demands of the overwhelming majority of the people to replace the specific interests of people from different quarters, especially the class nature of the working class. As Xiao Gongqin argues, the innovation of the “Three Represents” theory was meant to complete the historical ideology transformation of CCP from a revolutionary party to a ruling party. The CCP can keep its legitimacy under the ‘socialist market economy’ or any system that is conducive to the development of advanced productive forces, without promoting any revolutionary movement or keeping the ideal of egalitarianism.

Zheng Bijian, the executive vice president of the Central Party School who has been active in helping to create the “Three Represents,” argued that a party of the whole people would be a catch-all party that would include diverse and conflicting interests. To include all of the broad mass of contemporary Chinese intellectuals, science and technology workers, cultural workers, and economic managers, in the category of the so-called ‘middle class’ would weaken or even obliterate the working class.

In Jiang's speech on the "Three Represents" on the 80th anniversary of the founding of the CCP, he claimed that the expansion of "working class" would help the party remain advanced as the vanguard of the working class by expanding its popular support and increasing its social influence. Jiang made a statement on the concept of the working class that it includes intellectuals:“With intellectuals being part of the working class, the scientific, technical and educational level of the working class has been raised considerably... Consequently some workers have changed their jobs. But this has not changed the status of the Chinese working class. On the contrary, this will serve to improve the overall quality of the working class and give play to its advantages as a group in the long run. The Chinese working class has always been the basic force for promoting the advanced productive forces in China. Our Party must remain the vanguard of the working class and unswervingly and wholeheartedly rely on the working class.”

Influence and reception 
Jiang's theory was the subject of significant internal debate. Supporters viewed it as a further development of socialism with Chinese characteristics. Certain segments within the CCP criticized the "Three Represents" as being un-Marxist and a betrayal of basic Marxist values. Criticism originated on all ideological sides of the party.

Jiang disagreed with the assertion that his theories were not Marxist, and concluded that attaining the communist mode of production (as formulated by earlier communists) was more complex than had been realized; it was useless to try to force a change, as it had to develop naturally by following the economic laws of history. The theory is most notable for allowing capitalists, officially referred to as the "new social strata", to join the party on the grounds that they engaged in "honest labour and work" and through their labour contributed "to build[ing] socialism with Chinese characteristics." 

Jiang's decision to allow capitalists into the CCP was criticized as "political misconduct" and "ideological confusions." These critiques helped fuel the rise of the Chinese New Left movement.

At the time Jiang announced the theory, most entrepreneurs who were members of the CCP had been party members before starting their businesses. This change allowed for a new cohort of party members who could join after having had success in business. The greatest jump in the numbers of party members who are also entrepreneurs came in 2001, not long after the announcement of the Three Represents. In recent years (as of 2022), around 30-35% of Chinese entrepreneurs have been party members. 

Academic Lin Chun writes that while "nothing was politically incorrect in this banal statement" of the "Three Represents," "it simply signaled that the party no longer even pretended to be the vanguard of the working class."

References

Further reading

 On the “Three Represents”, a collection of speeches by Jiang Zemin
 
Jiang Zemin's Speech at the Meeting Celebrating the 80th Anniversary of the Founding of the Communist Party of China (2001). China Internet Information Center.

Jiang Zemin
Ideology of the Chinese Communist Party